The smoke signal is one of the oldest forms of long-distance communication. It is a form of visual communication used over a long distance.  In general smoke signals are used to transmit news, signal danger, or to gather people to a common area.

History and usage
In ancient China, soldiers along the Great Wall sent smoke signals on its beacon towers to warn one another of enemy invasion. The colour of the smoke communicated the size of the invading party. By placing the beacon towers at regular intervals, and situating a soldier in each tower, messages could be transmitted over the entire 7,300 kilometres of the Wall. Smoke signals also warned the inner castles of the invasion, allowing them to coordinate a defense and garrison supporting troops.

In ancient Sri Lanka, soldiers stationed on the mountain peaks would alert each other of impending enemy attack (from English, Dutch or Portuguese people) by signaling from peak to peak. In this way, they were able to transmit a message to the King in just a few hours.

Misuse of the smoke signal is known to have contributed to the fall of the Western Zhou Dynasty in the 8th century BCE. King You of Zhou had a habit of fooling his warlords with false warning beacons in order to amuse Bao Si, his concubine.

North American indigenous peoples also communicated via smoke signal. Each tribe had its own signaling system and understanding. A signaler started a fire on an elevation typically using damp grass, which would cause a column of smoke to rise. The grass would be taken off as it dried and another bundle would be placed on the fire. Reputedly the location of the smoke along the incline conveyed a meaning. If it came from halfway up the hill, this would signify all was well, but from the top of the hill it would signify danger.

Smoke signals remain in use today. The College of Cardinals uses smoke signals to indicate the selection of a new Pope during a papal conclave. Eligible cardinals conduct a secret ballot until someone receives a vote of two-thirds plus one. The ballots are burned after each vote. Black smoke indicates a failed ballot, while white smoke means a new Pope has been elected.

Colored smoke grenades are commonly used by military forces to mark positions, especially during calls for artillery or air support.

Smoke signals may also refer to smoke-producing devices used to send distress signals.

Examples

Native Americans

Lewis and Clark's journals cite several occasions when they adopted the Native American method of setting the plains on fire to communicate the presence of their party or their desire to meet with local tribes.

Yámana
Yámanas of South America used fire to send messages by smoke signals, for instance if a whale drifted ashore. The large amount of meat required notification of many people, so that it would not decay. They might also have used smoke signals on other occasions, thus it is possible that Magellan saw such fires (which inspired him to name the landscape Tierra del Fuego) but he may have seen the smoke or lights of natural phenomena.

Noon Gun 
The Cape Town Noon Gun, specifically the smoke its firing generates, was used to set marine chronometers in Table Bay.

Aboriginal Australians
Aboriginal Australians throughout Australia would send up smoke signals for various purposes. Sometimes to notify others of their presence, particularly when entering lands which were not their own. Sometimes used to describe visiting whites, smoke signals were the fastest way to send messages. Smoke signals were sometimes to notify of incursions by hostile tribes, or to arrange meetings between hunting parties of the same tribe. This signal could be from a fixed lookout on a ridge or from a mobile band of tribesman. "Putting up a smoke" would often result in nearby individuals or groups replying with their own signals. To carry information, the colour of the smoke was varied, sometimes black, white or blue depending on whether the material being burnt was wet grass, dry grass, reeds or other, and the shape of the smoke could be a column, ball or smoke ring. This message could include the names of individual tribesmen. Like other means of communication, signals could be misinterpreted. In one recorded instance, a smoke signal reply translated as "we are coming" was misinterpreted as joining a war party for protection of the tribe when it was actually hunting parties coming together after a successful hunt.

Aviation
Modern aviation has made skywriting possible.

See also 

 Polybius square

Notes

References
 
  Translation of the original:  Title means: “Stone of sun”; chapter means: “The land of burnt-out fires”. (Leningrad:  "Children's Literature" Publishing.)

External links 

History of telecommunications
History of ancient China
Native American culture
Native American history
Smoke
Optical communications
Semaphore
Western (genre) staples and terminology